Altenburg  is a hill in the county of Schwalm-Eder-Kreis, Hesse, Germany.

Hills of Hesse